Richie Richmond is a retired American soccer midfielder who played professionally in the USISL and USL A-League.  He was the 1993 USISL indoor MVP.

Richmond graduated from St. Pius X Catholic High School where he was part of the 1987 Georgia High School champion soccer team.  He attended Clemson University and his freshman season, he scored the second Clemson goal as the Tigers won the 1987 NCAA Division I Men's Soccer Championship.  After college, he joined the Atlanta Magic of the USISL.  Richmond won three USISL indoor titles with the Magic and was the 1993 USISL Indoor MVP.  In 1996, he ranked seventh on the league’s points list.  In 1996, the Magic folded and Richmond moved to the Atlanta Ruckus.  In 1998 the Ruckus was renamed the Silverbacks.  He finished his career in 1999.  In addition to playing professional soccer, Richmond has worked for several telecommunications company including BellSouth and AT&T.

References

Living people
American soccer players
A-League (1995–2004) players
Atlanta Magic players
Atlanta Silverbacks players
Clemson Tigers men's soccer players
USISL players
Association football midfielders
Soccer players from Georgia (U.S. state)
Year of birth missing (living people)